Albert Muis (22 October 1914 in Baarn – 24 September 1988) is an artist from the Netherlands.

Biography

He was born to a Protestant family in Baarn, a town in central Netherlands, the youngest of three children and the only boy.
He became interested in painting and music around the age of seven. Encouraged by his father, Chief Accountant of a gas factory, he took lessons in drawing and music. As a teenager, he served in several chamber music ensembles and became first violinist in a regional orchestra.
After leaving secondary school in Hilversum, Muis was irresistibly attracted to painting when he abandoned music.

In 1931, he joined an art school in Amsterdam.
He was admitted to the Academy of Fine Arts in Amsterdam, Netherlands, in July 1934. He studied drawing and painting until 1935. He took classes in drawing and painting until 1935.

In 1935, he made his first trip to France. He came back overwhelmed by the harsh beauty of Breton landscapes.
Late in 1935, he moved to Amsterdam, where he took courses in Monumental Art tutored by Professor Campendonck and specialized in the techniques of wall painting (1935–1938).

In 1937 he made a lengthy trip to Italy. He visited Florence, Venice, Pompeï and was enthralled by Giotto's works.
Back in the Netherlands he completed his first mural painting, a state commission for the Dutch Pavilion at the World Exhibition in Paris.

In 1939, he worked with architects for the Tuyen Luchtvaart Laboratorium in Amsterdam. He also focused on easel painting in his studio in Amstel, 17 in Amsterdam.
He made his first exhibition in Amsterdam (gouache, oil on wood) at Galerie Robert, Amsterdam in May 1940.
In June 1942, he participated in an exhibition of young avant-garde painters in Amsterdam, a demonstration which was forcibly condemned by the Nazis.

After the war, in 1946, he married Hanna Deppe, of Swiss origin Switzerland. Their daughter was born in Amsterdam in 1947. 

He exhibited in Groningen, Netherlands, in 1946 and in 1947 at Galerie De Boer in Amsterdam.
In 1948, he participated in a group exhibition in Rotterdam and in the same year, painted three frescoes  ("The Mourners") in the entrance hall of the Oosterbegraafplaats [2] (cemetery in Amsterdam), commissioned by the municipality of Amsterdam.

In 1949, he participated in the Venice Biennale and exhibited in Amsterdam, Groningen and Rotterdam.

But meanwhile, Albert Muis had settled in France. During 1946, he discovered the Pyrenees-Orientales, particularly Port-Vendres and its surroundings. He returned to the same region in early 1948 and, dazzled by the Côte Vermeille, he and his family decided to settle in Port-Vendres, in a small isolated house surrounded by vineyards (the "Croix Blanche").

In 1951, their son was born in Perpignan.

In 1952, he made a wall painting for the great Auditorium Oosterbegraafplaats in Amsterdam: "Arcadia" of Mediterranean-inspiration (from sketches done in Park Vilmarest in Argelès-sur-Mer).

In 1954 he exhibited in Amsterdam, Gallery de Boer and Perpignan, Salle Arago.

In 1955 he exhibited in Utrecht. In the same year, he produced a mural painting at the University of Groningen: "Waterfowl."

The Stedelijk Museum in Amsterdam acquired some of his works, including his "Palm Tree" drawing for the Rijksmuseum Prenten Cabinet and also his gouache, "Still Life with Fish", and oils on canvas.

In 1956, he received the first prize in a painting competition organized by K.N.S.M. a major Dutch shipping company, for its "Departure of the El mansour from Port-Vendres".

In 1957 he exhibited in Paris, Gallery Bassano and also travelled to the Netherlands to achieve the "Four Elements" a mural painting for "The Atom" exhibition in Schiphol.

1958 was marked again by an extended stay in his native country to complete two murals. The first, "Narcissus" in Spinoza Lyceum Amsterdam and the second, "Theseus and Ariadne's thread", in another school, the School voor Maatschappelijkwerk in Amsterdam. These two wall paintings were created from numerous sketches made in the Roussillon countryside, on the banks of Tech, near Arles sur Tech.

In 1959, the city of Port-Vendres offered an exhibition of his works in the exhibition hall of the town hall.

In 1960 he exhibited at Galerie Barbizon, Paris.

Meanwhile, in the course of several hikes in the Albères Maritimes, the painter discovered Mas Rossignol, then inhabited. He left Port-Vendres with his family for this idyllic but isolated place. He remained there until his death.

In 1961 he exhibited in Perpignan, Atelier 45, in 1962 at the Grand Café de Ceret and 1966, again in Perpignan (Salle Arago).

His atelier (studio) in the oldest part of Mas Rossignol, housed in the oldest part, also became a meeting place for art lovers (many private exhibitions).

In 1967 he went to the Netherlands for an exhibition of his works in Laren (Room Hamdorff). Given the success of the enterprise, he came back to Laren in 1970, Singer Museum.

In 1970-1971, his works were also on display in Florence, Italy, Gallery Paolo Vaccerino. The Cultural Center in Bellefontaine Mirail, Toulouse, presented his works in 1972. Albert Muis presented some of his paintings on two occasions at the Salon des Indépendants in Paris in 1973 and 1974.

In 1974 he exhibited at the "Club of Law and Economics," Place des Invalides in Paris.

In 1975 he exhibited in Paris, Galerie Degueux, Place, Paris and Gallery Profils, Collioure. He came back to Gallery Profils in 1976.

In 1978, he had an exhibition of his works in Laren, Singer Museum.

In 1979 he exhibited in Amsterdam, Galerie Fijnaut.

In September 1982, Anne Muis died at the age of sixty-nine, after a long illness. Muis did not exhibit in public places any more, only in his studio. Greatly affected by the death of Anne, his own health became precarious. He died on September 24, 1988, aged seventy-four.

Works
Frescos, 
 Les Pleureuses (1948), Entrance Hall Oosterbegraafplaats Amsterdam
 Acardia (1952), Oosterbegraafplaats Amsterdam
 Waterflow (1955), University Groningen
 Theseus and Ariadne's thread (1958),  the Social Academy Amsterdam
 Narcissus (1958), Spinoza Lyceum Amsterdam

Several oil paintings.
 A lady seated in year interior 
 Argelès sur Mer
 Scène de plage
 https://web.archive.org/web/20110724151212/http://www.denieuweooster.nl/uploaded/HALAULA.jpg
 https://web.archive.org/web/20110724151220/http://www.denieuweooster.nl/uploaded/d17.jpg
 https://web.archive.org/web/20110724151226/http://www.denieuweooster.nl/uploaded/accomosatie-wisselend-2.jpg
 https://web.archive.org/web/20110724151247/http://www.denieuweooster.nl/uploaded/accomodatie-wisselend--3.jpg

References
Albert Muis (1914-1988) A seated lady in an interior

http://www.christies.com/LotFinder/lot_details.aspx?pos=3&intObjectID=1985822&sid=
https://web.archive.org/web/20111006080009/http://www.arcadja.com/auctions/fr/muis_albert/artiste/68599/

External links
https://web.archive.org/web/20101106134127/http://www.denieuweooster.nl/pagina.php?subj=architectuur
https://web.archive.org/web/20110724154336/http://collectie.icn.nl/frmResults.aspx?VrijZoeken=&Inventarisnummer=&Titel=&Beschrijving=&Vervaardiger=muis&Trefwoorden=&Materialen=&Thumbnail=N&Vermissing=N&verv_guid=
https://www.flickr.com/search/people/?q=albert%20muis

1914 births
1988 deaths
People from Baarn
20th-century Dutch painters
Dutch male painters
20th-century Dutch male artists